Pan Jiajun (Chinese: 潘嘉俊; born 8 May 1995) is a Chinese footballer who currently plays as a midfielder for China League One side Kunshan FC.

Club career
Pan Jiajun started his football career in July 2015 when Guangzhou R&F loaned him to Meixian Hakka in the China League Two division. He transferred to Chinese Super League side Henan Jianye in February 2016. On 9 April 2016, he made his debut for Henan Jianye in the 2016 Chinese Super League against Jiangsu Suning, coming on as a substitute for Yang Kuo in the 45th minute.

In the summer of 2018, Pan returned to Guangzhou R&F on a free transfer, however he would only be in the reserve squad until in early 2019 he was released. He would join third tier football club Kunshan FC on 12 July 2019. He would go on to score his first goal for the club in a league game against Zhejiang Yiteng F.C. on 28 September 2019 in a 3-1 victory.

Career statistics
Statistics accurate as of match played 31 December 2020.

References

External links
 

1995 births
Living people
Chinese footballers
Footballers from Guangdong
Henan Songshan Longmen F.C. players
Kunshan F.C. players
China League Two players
China League One players
Chinese Super League players
Association football midfielders